is a railway station on the northern Ōu Main Line in the city of Hirakawa, Aomori Prefecture, Japan, operated by East Japan Railway Company (JR East).

Lines

Station layout
The station has two opposed side platforms located on an embankment, with station building located at a lower level. There is no connection between platforms, each of which has a separate exit.

Platforms

History
Tsugaru-Yunosawa Station was opened on June 1, 1949 as a station on the Japan National Railways (JNR). It has been unattended since October 1, 1971. With the privatization of the JNR on April 1, 1987, it came under the operational control of JR East.

Surrounding area
Yunosawa Onsen

See also
 List of Railway Stations in Japan

External links

  

Stations of East Japan Railway Company
Railway stations in Aomori Prefecture
Ōu Main Line
Hirakawa, Aomori
Railway stations in Japan opened in 1949